Akindele Jeleel Ayodeji (born April 2, 1983) is a Nigerian professional basketball player for the Halcones de Xalapa of the Liga Nacional de Baloncesto Profesional (LNBP).

Collegiate career
Akindele chose Chicago State over Rutgers, St. Peters and St. Marys. During Akindele's first season in Chicago, the 7'1" center averaged 7.1 points per game, 5.6 rebounds and 1.94 blocks per game. In his second season, Akindele improved his block total by 8 in 4 fewer games (2.50 bpg), as well as improving his scoring average to 12 ppg. His best game, statistically, was when he registered 28 points (10-for-13 field goals), 21 rebounds, and 4 blocks in 79–71 loss to Green Bay on December 1, 2004. He was also named the Mid-Continent Conference defensive player of the year for 2004–2005.

Professional career
Akindele left Chicago State after his sophomore year, declaring himself eligible for the 2005 NBA draft. Going unselected in 2005, he had a short stint with the NBA team Golden State Warriors. Akindele was then selected in the fourth round of the Development League's Draft by the Fort Worth Flyers.

In December 2010 he signed with Montepaschi Siena until the end of the 2010–11 season. In August 2011 he returned to Russia to play for Spartak Primorye. In February 2012, he signed in Iran with Petrochimi Bandar Imam. In August 2012, he signed with Juvecaserta Basket. In April 2013, he left them and signed with Champville in Lebanon.

In August 2013, he signed with Budućnost Podgorica. Once the Adriatic League regular season finished, in April 2014 Akindele signed for Gran Canaria until the end of the 2013–14 season.

In September 2014, he signed with Baloncesto Fuenlabrada of Spain for the 2014–15 ACB season. He won the ACB Player of the Month Award in January 2015.

On June 11, 2015, he signed with Yeşilgiresun Belediye of the Turkish Basketball League for the 2015–16 season. On June 27, 2015, he signed a short-term deal with Vaqueros de Bayamón of Puerto Rico for the rest of the 2015 BSN season. In July 2015, he joined the Metros de Santiago of Dominican Republic for the rest of the 2015 LNB season.

In October 2016, Akindele signed with Fuerza Regia of the Mexican LNBP. On April 5, 2017, he re-joined the Vaqueros de Bayamón.

In December 2017, Akindele signed with Yalovaspor BK of the Turkish Basketball First League.  On April 10, 2018, he returned to Puerto Rico with Capitanes de Arecibo. Akindele rejoined Vaqueros de Bayamón on February 26, 2020, replacing the injured Greg Smith.

National team
He was part of the Nigeria national basketball team, and represented Nigeria at the 2007 and 2009 African Championships, averaging 8.3 points, 4.7 rebounds, and 0.6 assists per game.

References

External links
Deji Akindele at acb.com
Deji Akindele at draftexpress.com
Deji Akindele at nba.com
Deji Akindele at eurobasket.com

1983 births
Living people
ABA League players
African Games bronze medalists for Nigeria
African Games medalists in basketball
Baloncesto Fuenlabrada players
Baloncesto Superior Nacional players
BC Nizhny Novgorod players
BC Spartak Primorye players
Capitanes de Arecibo players
CB Gran Canaria players
Centers (basketball)
Chicago State Cougars men's basketball players
Competitors at the 2007 All-Africa Games
Élan Béarnais players
Nigerian expatriate basketball people in Montenegro
Nigerian expatriate basketball people in Puerto Rico
Fort Worth Flyers players
Fuerza Regia de Monterrey players
Iowa Energy players
Juvecaserta Basket players
Lega Basket Serie A players
Liga ACB players
KK Budućnost players
Marinos B.B.C. players
Mens Sana Basket players
Nigerian expatriate basketball people in the United States
Nigerian expatriate basketball people in France
Nigerian expatriate basketball people in Iran
Nigerian expatriate basketball people in Italy
Nigerian expatriate basketball people in Lebanon
Nigerian expatriate basketball people in Mexico
Nigerian expatriate basketball people in Russia
Nigerian expatriate basketball people in Spain
Nigerian expatriate basketball people in Turkey
Nigerian expatriate basketball people in Nicaragua
Nigerian men's basketball players
Petrochimi Bandar Imam BC players
Real Estelí Baloncesto players
Sportspeople from Abeokuta
Victoria Libertas Pallacanestro players
Yalovaspor BK players
Yeşilgiresun Belediye players
Yoruba sportspeople
Halcones de Xalapa players